Duospina trichella is a moth in the family Batrachedridae. It was described by August Busck in 1908. It is found in North America, where it has been recorded from Florida, Illinois, Indiana, Louisiana, Maine, Maryland, Ohio, Quebec and West Virginia.

The wingspan is about 13 mm. Adults have been recorded on wing in March and from June to September.

References

Natural History Museum Lepidoptera generic names catalog

Batrachedridae
Moths described in 1908
Moths of North America
Taxa named by August Busck